Luis Ricardo Aldana Prieto (born 3 May 1954) is a Mexican politician affiliated with the PRI. As of 2013 he served as Deputy of both the LX and LXII Legislatures of the Mexican Congress representing Veracruz. He also served as Senator in the LVIII and LIX Legislatures.

References

1954 births
Living people
Politicians from Veracruz
Members of the Senate of the Republic (Mexico)
Members of the Chamber of Deputies (Mexico)
Institutional Revolutionary Party politicians
21st-century Mexican politicians
People from Orizaba